Pazeh may refer to:

Pazeh people
Pazeh language